College Boulevard is a station in Oceanside, California that is served by North County Transit District's Sprinter light rail line. The station is located at 4103½ Oceanside Boulevard.

Platforms and tracks

References

External links
SPRINTER Stations

North County Transit District stations
Railway stations in the United States opened in 2008
Oceanside, California
2008 establishments in California